Sheerness East is a disused railway station serving Sheerness on the Isle of Sheppey. It opened in 1901 and closed in 1950. The site of the station is now covered by housing.

References

External links
 Sheerness East station on navigable 1940 O. S. map
 Photograph of Sheerness East station.

Disused railway stations in Kent
Former Sheppey Light Railway stations
Railway stations in Great Britain opened in 1901
Railway stations in Great Britain closed in 1950
Sheerness